Pseudomancopsetta andriashevi, the Pygmy flounder, is a species of southern flounder known from deep waters off of the southern coast of Chile as well as from around the Crozet Islands and Prince Edward Islands where it occurs at depths of from .  This species grows to a length of  SL.  This species is the only known member of its genus.

References
 

Achiropsettidae
Fish described in 1984